The 2014 South East Asian Table Tennis Championships were held in Phnom Penh, Cambodia from 1 to 5 November 2014.

Medal summary

Medal table

Some medals are unknown

Events

Missing

See also
Asian Table Tennis Union
Asian Table Tennis Championships

References

South East Asian Table Tennis Championships
South East Asian Table Tennis Championships
South East Asian Table Tennis Championships
Table Tennis Championships
Table tennis competitions in Cambodia
International sports competitions hosted by Cambodia
South East Asian Table Tennis Championships